The Public Affairs Centre (PAC) is a not-for-profit research think tank situated in Bengaluru, Karnataka. It works at improving the quality of governance in India. The institute conducts research activities in two major fields, public policy and participatory governance.  Public Affairs Centre works under four different research groups, (a) Public Policy Research Group (b) Environmental Governance Group (c) Citizen Action Support Group (d) Participatory Governance Research Group. The Institute publishes Citizen Report Cards – research studies to improve public services –  as well as for its work on electoral transparency, public works quality monitoring tools and approaches, and audits of the Right to Information Act and the National Rural Employment Guarantee Act in India.

History
In 1992, Samuel Paul, an economist, teacher and management professional, was part of a team that developed a ‘report card’ on Bangalore’s public services. Anchoring on the twin concepts of measurement and comparison, the report cards generated objective and credible citizen feedback on issues related to the delivery of public services like quality, reliability, corruption and satisfaction. The approach received much national and international attention. The public debates the findings triggered and the media interest that issues like corruption generated provided a much needed stimulus to several public agencies in Bangalore to review their performances. These initial responses led to the formal creation of the Public Affairs Centre in 1994 with financial support from the National Foundation for India and the Ford Foundation. Dr. Paul was the founding chairperson.

Board 
 Dr. A Ravindra
K.R.S Murthy, Member
A. Ravindra, Member
H. Sudarshan, Member
Sudhakar Rao, Member
Vivek Kulkarni, Member
R. Balasubramaniam, Member
 Gurucharan Gollerkeri, Director

References

External links 
 http://timesofindia.indiatimes.com/city/bengaluru/Karnataka-3rd-best-in-public-affairs-index/articleshow/51378219.cms
 http://www.thehindu.com/news/cities/bangalore/kerala-tn-secure-top-ranks-in-governance/article8347525.ece
 http://indianexpress.com/article/india/india-news-india/kerala-tn-karnataka-top-good-governance-list-report/

Environmental organisations based in India
Sustainability organizations
Think tanks based in India
Research institutes in Bangalore
1994 establishments in Karnataka